General elections were held in Bermuda on 29 October 1985. The result was a victory for the United Bermuda Party, which won 31 of the 40 seats in the House of Assembly.

A total of 98 candidates contested the election, although one seat, Southampton West, was uncontested and the two United Bermuda Party candidates returned unopposed.

Results

References

Elections in Bermuda
Bermuda
1985 in Bermuda
Bermuda
October 1985 events in North America
Election and referendum articles with incomplete results